The Ministry of Finance and Planning is a government ministry of Tanzania.

It "manages the overall revenue, expenditure, and financing of the Government of the United Republic of Tanzania and provides the Government with advice on the broad financial AFFAIRS of Tanzania in support of the Government's economic and social objectives." Its duties include "preparing the Central Government budget; developing tax policy and legislation; managing Government borrowings on financial markets; determining expenditure allocations to different Government institutions; transferring central grants to local governments; developing regulatory policy for the country's financial sector in cooperation with the Bank of Tanzania[,] and representing Tanzania within international financial institutions."

The ministry is located in Dodoma and is headed by Minister Hon. Dr Mwigulu Nchemba and Deputy Minister Hon. Hamad Chande.

History 
The ministry was previously known as the Ministry of Finance and Economic Affairs.

List of Ministers

See also
Economy of Tanzania
Government of Tanzania

References

External links
 

F
 
Tanzania
Tanzania
Economy of Tanzania